Angevin or House of Anjou may refer to:
County of Anjou or Duchy of Anjou, a historical county, and later Duchy, in France
Angevin (language), the traditional langue d'oïl spoken in Anjou
Counts and Dukes of Anjou
House of Ingelger, a Frankish noble family who were counts of Anjou between the 10th and 12th centuries
Angevin kings of England, members of the House of Anjou who occupied the English throne in the 12th and early 13th centuries
Angevin Empire, the assemblage of territories in Britain and France ruled by the Angevin kings of England
Angevin Kings of Jerusalem, members of the House of Anjou who occupied the throne of the Kingdom of Jerusalem in the 12th century, relatives of the Angevin kings of England
Capetian House of Anjou, a cadet branch of the Capetian dynasty of France, members of which became kings of Sicily, Naples, Hungary and Poland from the 13th to the 15th century
House of Valois-Anjou, a cadet branch of the French house of Valois, which ruled Naples and held territories such as Anjou, Maine, Piedmont and Provence in the 14th and 15th centuries

Language and nationality disambiguation pages